The 2010 Turkmenistan Higher League (Ýokary Liga) season was the eighteenth season of Turkmenistan's professional football league. It began on 2 April 2010 with the first round of games and ended in December. FC Balkan won the title.

Teams
As league size was expanded from nine to ten teams, no team had to face relegation after the conclusion of the 2009 season. FC Ahal as champions of the Turkmen second level of football were promoted. FC Bagtyýarlyk, Nebitçi Balkanabat and Turan Daşoguz were renamed FC Lebap, FC Balkan and FC Daşoguz, respectively.

League table

Positions by round

Results

League season

Season statistics

Top scorers

Including matches played on 11 December 2010

Scoring
First goalscorer: 
Didargylyç Urazow for FC Balkan against Lebap, 26th minute (2 April 2010)
First hat-trick: 
Ata Geldiýew for FC Aşgabat against FC Ahal (15 May 2010)

International competitions

2010 CIS Cup
 2010 CIS Cup:
 FC Levadia Tallinn – HTTU Aşgabat (1–3)
HTTU Aşgabat –  Russia U-21 (2–4)
HTTU Aşgabat  –  FC Dynamo Kyiv (2–4)
 FC Bunyodkor – HTTU Aşgabat (1–1) (2–4 pen.)
HTTU Aşgabat  –  Rubin Kazan (0–4)

2010 AFC President's Cup
 2010 AFC President's Cup:
HTTU Aşgabat –  Druk Star FC (8–0)
 Yadanabon FC – HTTU Aşgabat (0–0)
 Dordoi-Dynamo Naryn – HTTU Aşgabat (2–0)

References

External links
  
  

Ýokary Liga seasons
Turk
Turk
1